Hoseyni or Hoseini, also rendered as Husaini or 'oseyni, may refer to various places in Iran:
 Hoseyni-ye Olya, East Azerbaijan Province
 Hoseyni, Isfahan
 Hoseyni, Khuzestan
 Hoseyni, Kurdistan
 Hoseyni, Nishapur, Razavi Khorasan Province
 Hoseyni, Taybad, Razavi Khorasan Province
 Hoseyni, Yazd
 Hoseyni Rural District, in Khuzestan Province

See also

 Husseini